Giacomini is an Italian surname, derived from the diminutive of the masculine Italian personal name Giacomo (James). Notable people with the surname include:

 Andrea Giacomini (born 1987), Italian footballer
 Audrey Giacomini (born 1986), French actress and model  
 Breno Giacomini (born 1985), American football offensive tackle
 Carlo Giacomini (1840–1898), Italian anatomist and neuroscientist
 Diogo Giacomini (born 1979), Brazilian football manager
 Gianni Giacomini (born 1958), retired Italian cyclist
 Giuseppe Giacomini (1940–2021), Italian dramatic tenor
 Kathleen Giacomini, American bioengineer
 Lorenzo Giacomini (1552–1598), theorist of the Doctrine of the affections
 Massimo Giacomini (born 1939), retired Italian football player and football manager

Italian-language surnames
Patronymic surnames
Surnames from given names